Rakkayi Koyil is a 1993 Indian Tamil-language drama film, directed by Manivasagam. The film stars Vijayakumar, Selva and Kasthuri, with an ensemble supporting cast including Manorama, Goundamani and Senthil. It was released on 5 February 1993.

Plot

Cast 
Vijayakumar as Bommu Nayakar
Selva as Chinrasu
Kasthuri as Vellaiyamma
Manorama as Jakkamma
Vadivukkarasi as Ramattha
Goundamani as a barber
Senthil as barber

Soundtrack 
The music was composed by Ilaiyaraaja.

Reception 
R. P. R of Kalki praised Vijayakumar's performance and the cinematography but called Ilaiyaraaja's music average.

References

External links 
 

1990s Tamil-language films
1993 drama films
1993 films
Films directed by Manivasagam
Films scored by Ilaiyaraaja
Indian drama films